"Texas (When I Die)" is a song co-written and originally recorded by American country music artist Ed Bruce. Bruce's version peaked at number 52 on the Billboard Hot Country Singles chart in 1977.

The song was covered by American country music artist Tanya Tucker, initially as the B-side of another cover, Buddy Holly's "Not Fade Away".  It was released in November 1978 as the first single from her album TNT.  Tucker's version reached number 5 on the Billboard Hot Country Singles chart.

Chart performance

Ed Bruce

Tanya Tucker

Year-end charts

In popular culture
Throughout the 1980s, the song was used as the Dallas Cowboys' touchdown song at their home games and as professional wrestler David Von Erich's entrance music.

References

1977 singles
1978 singles
1977 songs
Tanya Tucker songs
Songs about Texas
Songs about death
Ed Bruce songs
Songs written by Ed Bruce
Song recordings produced by Jerry Goldstein (producer)
MCA Records singles
Songs written by Patsy Bruce